Hurricane Michael of the 2000 Atlantic hurricane season caused widespread, but relatively minor damage in Atlantic Canada. The seventeenth tropical cyclone, thirteenth named storm, and eighth hurricane of the season, Michael developed from a non-tropical system to the southwest of Bermuda on October 15. The system was initially subtropical, but rapidly acquired tropical characteristics by October 17. Michael quickly strengthened into a hurricane later that day. By October 20, Michael peaked as a Category 2 hurricane on the Saffir-Simpson hurricane wind scale at a relatively high latitude of 44°N. The storm weakened slightly to a Category 1 hurricane and became extratropical shortly before making landfall in Newfoundland on October 20.

As the intensity of Michael was equivalent to a Category 1 hurricane during landfall, high winds were reported throughout Atlantic Canada, especially in Newfoundland. High winds caused minor structure damage across Newfoundland, confined to vinyl siding peeled off, shattered windows, and unroofed houses. In addition, sporadic power outages were also reported from Corner Brook to St. John's. Michael also dropped rainfall across Atlantic Canada and in Maine.

Meteorological history

The system originated out of a non-tropical cold-core upper level low that drifted southward into the subtropics. The low interacted with a cold front, which resulted in the development of a stationary front over the Bahamas on October 10. As the cold low drifted southward, a surface low developed on October 12. The surface low remained mostly stationary until early on October 15 as it merged with the upper-level low and deepened while north of the Bahamas and east of the coast of Florida. Later that day, the system gained enough tropical characteristics and became organized enough to be classified as a subtropical depression. Around 0000 UTC on October 16, it strengthened into a subtropical storm after satellite classifications showed a stronger storm. Later that day, the cyclone continued to develop as more thunderstorms formed and persisted near the low-level circulation.

By 0000 UTC on October 17, the transition was completed and Michael was reclassified as a tropical storm as supported by satellite classifications via the Dvorak technique. Shortly thereafter, the National Hurricane Center initiated advisories on Tropical Depression Seventeen; post-analysis later discovered it was actually a tropical storm. A well-defined eye quickly developed early on October 17 as Michael began to strengthen and continued to organize. At that point, Michael began to move northward. While Michael was maintaining minimal hurricane status, the eye remained ragged, yet well-defined. Early on October 19, Michael briefly strengthened to 140 km/h (85 mph) before weakening slightly six hours later. Breaking into cooler water, Michael began its extratropical transition while accelerating to the northeast towards Newfoundland, which prevented significant weakening. The acceleration was caused by a shortwave trough embedded within strong southwesterly mid-level flow.

Unexpectedly, Michael began to rapidly intensify on October 19 while in extratropical transition. At 2300 UTC on October 19, shortly after completing its transition to an extratropical cyclone, Michael made landfall near Parsons Harbour, Newfoundland with winds of 155 km/h (100 mph). The extratropical system gradually weakened as it tracked across Newfoundland on October 20, and slowed down considerably with the presence of the trough. The storm was absorbed by another extratropical low just north of Newfoundland that afternoon.

Impact

Because it was unknown that Michael became extratropical before landfall, it was initially considered the first tropical cyclone to strike Newfoundland since Hurricane Luis in 1995. Furthermore, Michael was also considered the first hurricane to make landfall in Canada since Hurricane Hortense in 1996. When the Meteorological Service of Canada and the National Research Council flew a Convair research flight into Michael on October 19, it was the first successful research flight made into a tropical cyclone by those agencies. Subsequent flights have been made into Tropical Storm Karen, Hurricane Isabel (while inland), Hurricane Juan, and Hurricane Ophelia.

Newfoundland

In advance of the storm, the Newfoundland Weather Centre posted wind warnings, gale warnings, storm warnings, and hurricane warnings throughout Newfoundland. Rainfall advisories were also issued in portions of the East Coast, Central Newfoundland, the South Coast, and the West Coast. Offshore, storm force wind warnings were declared on October 19 for Newfoundland waters. Several Special Weather Statements were also posted.

Light to moderate damage was reported throughout Newfoundland, primarily as a result of the strong winds. The entire region was affected by Michael, though the majority of the damage was confined to small communities east of where the storm made landfall, including Gaultois, Harbour Breton, Hermitage and English Harbour West. These areas reported significant power outages and minor structural damage; vinyl siding was peeled off, windows were shattered, and roof shingles were torn off in some localized locations. The most severe damage was in Gaultois, where several roofs were torn off and trees were uprooted. Wind damage also occurred in the St. John's Metropolitan Area, where a Sobeys store in Conception Bay South had broken windows. Sporadic power outages were reported throughout the island, as far east as St. John's, and as far west as Corner Brook. As the storm struck at low tide, storm surge was insignificant. Despite severe winds, damage was relatively light due to high construction standards in Newfoundland, where winter storms routinely result in hurricane-force winds, as well as the sparse population of the area affected.

The tug Atlantic Elm lost its tow to the unmanned barge Portland Star on October 19. The barge was carrying over 18,000 tonnes of cement and diesel fuel and was later reported to have sunk in the Fortune Bay. Damage was reported to numerous pleasure craft around the bay due to the waves; two sailboats were toppled. Also, ferry service between Newfoundland and Nova Scotia was disrupted. Several offshore buoys and ships reported high winds and low barometric pressure, as well as waves of up to 16.9 m (55 ft).

Elsewhere
However, as a tropical cyclone, Michael remained far from the island. Impact outside Newfoundland was generally light. However, rainfall was greater in some areas of Nova Scotia than in Newfoundland, where precipitation reached  over North Mountain. Light rain was also reported in New Brunswick, Prince Edward Island, and Quebec.

See also

 List of Canada hurricanes
 Timeline of the 2000 Atlantic hurricane season

References

External links

 Meteorological Service of Canada report
 National Hurricane Center archive

2000 Atlantic hurricane season
Category 2 Atlantic hurricanes
Hurricanes in Canada
Hurricane Michael
Michael